The Mail and More Comets is a basketball team that played in the Philippine Basketball League and is owned by Lina Group of Companies

Current roster

Former players and coaches
 Doug Kramer
 Lawrence Chongson (coach)
 Macky Escalona
 JR Quinahan
 Ronjay Buenafe
 Jerby del Rosario
 Mike Bravo
 Elmer Espiritu

References

External links
Mail and More PBL website

Former Philippine Basketball League teams